The Black Trip album from Swiss heavy metal band Samael is a double DVD set which contains a concert held on Summer Breeze Festival (2002), a live concert held in Kraków, Poland, in 1996 during their "Passage" world tour and also a bootleg concert shot in Illinois (USA) during the "Ceremony of Opposites" tour. There are also video clips for the songs "Jupiterian Vibe", "Infra Galaxia" and "Baphomet's Throne" as well as some interviews and footage shot at Woodhouse Studios during the making of the Passage album.

Track listing

DVD 1 
Live at the Summer Breeze Festival in 2002:

 Era One
 Year Zero
 Shining Kingdom
 Rain
 Together
 The Cross
 Home
 Jupiterian Vibe
 Radiant Star
 Infra Galaxia
 The Ones Who Came Before
 Outro – Ceremony of Opposites
 Black Trip
 My Saviour
 Video clip: Jupiterian Vibe
 Video clip: Infra Galaxia
 Video clip: Baphomet's Throne
 Interviews Passage / Exodus Studio Sessions

DVD 2 
Live Passage Tour 1996 in Kraków, Poland:
 Rebellion
 Son of Earth
 Shining Kingdom
 Angels Decay
 Mask of the Red Death
 Into the Pentagram
 Flagellation
 Jupiterian Vibe
 The Ones Who Came Before
 Crown
 Rain
 My Saviour

Live USA 1994:
 Black Trip
 To Our Martyrs
 Son of Earth
 Crown
 Baphomet's Throne
 Flagellation
 After the Sepulture
 Intro / ... Into the Chaos
 Celebration of the Fourth
 Ceremony of Opposites

2003 live albums
2003 video albums
Samael (band) albums
Century Media Records live albums
Live video albums